Louis Malespina (21 June 1874 – 16 August 1949) was a French painter. His work was part of the art competitions at the 1928 Summer Olympics and the 1932 Summer Olympics.

References

1874 births
1949 deaths
20th-century French painters
20th-century French male artists
French male painters
Olympic competitors in art competitions
People from Meurthe-et-Moselle